The 40th Fajr Film Festival (Persian: چهلمین دوره جشنواره فیلم فجر‎) was held from 1 to 11 February 2022 in Tehran, Iran. The nominees for the 40th Fajr Film Festival were announced on February 10, 2022, at a press conference.

Jury

Main Competition 
 Masoud Jafari Jozani
 Majid Entezami
 Shahab Hosseini
 Mohammad Ali Basheh Ahangar
 Mohammad Davoudi
 Mehdi Sajadeh Chi
 Pejman Lashkari Pour

Documentary 
 Ahmad Zabeti Jehrami
 Mohammad Tahami Nejad
 Mohammadali Farsi
 Morteza Shabani
 Mohammadreza Abassian

Short Film 

 Ahmadreza Motamedi
 Danesh Eghbashavi
 Hamed Jafari

Advertising Competition 

 Ali Nikraftar
 Mehrdad Khoshbakht
 Mohammad Rouhallamin

Winners and nominees

Main Competition

First Look

Advertising Competition

Films with multiple wins

Films with multiple nominations

Films

Main Competition

Documentary

Short Film

References

External links 

 

Fajr International Film Festival ceremonies
Fajr Film Festival
Fajr Film Festival
Fajr Film Festival